Elsa Kobberstad  (21 July 1918 – 7 July 2007) was a Norwegian schoolteacher and politician.

She was born in Narvik to Albert Emil Antonsen and Louise Erlandsen. She was elected representative to the Storting for the period 1981–1985 for the Conservative Party.

References

1918 births
2007 deaths
People from Narvik
Conservative Party (Norway) politicians
Members of the Storting